The Bayer designations m Velorum and M Velorum are distinct. Due to technical limitations, both designations link here. For the star
m Velorum, see HD 85622
M Velorum, see HD 83446

Velorum, m
Vela (constellation)